William Hubert Briare (July 13, 1930 – December 8, 2006) was an American politician. He was the mayor of Las Vegas from 1975 to 1987.  Briare was a member of the Democratic Party.

Personal life
Briare was born in Long Beach, California.

In the 1960s, Briare served in the Nevada Assembly and as a Clark County Commissioner. In 1971, he lost his first campaign for mayor of Las Vegas, Nevada to Oran K. Gragson, but Briare was elected in his next attempt in 1975, defeating Harry Reid.

Briare was so positive about the city that people would ask him if he was the president of the Chamber of Commerce.  His obituary in the Las Vegas Review Journal noted that Briare's "public tenure came during a key time when control of casinos shifted from organized crime figures to corporations."

In 1994, Briare ran for Lieutenant Governor of Nevada, but lost to Lonnie Hammargren.

Briare died in Las Vegas at the age of 76, and was interred at Woodlawn Cemetery.

References

External links
 

1930 births
2006 deaths
Mayors of Las Vegas
Democratic Party members of the Nevada Assembly
People from the Las Vegas Valley
People from Long Beach, California
20th-century American politicians
Burials at Woodlawn Cemetery (Las Vegas)